Podkraj pri Velenju is a settlement in the Municipality of Velenje in northern Slovenia. It lies in the Ložnica Hills southwest of the town of Velenje. The area is part of the traditional region of Styria. The entire municipality is now included in the Savinja Statistical Region.

Name
The name of the settlement was changed from Podkraj to Podkraj pri Velenju in 1955.

Church
The local church is dedicated to Saint James and belongs to the Parish of Velenje–Saint Mary. It dates to the late 16th century and was rebuilt in the 17th and 18th centuries.

References

External links
Podkraj pri Velenju at Geopedia

Populated places in the City Municipality of Velenje